Lamida buruensis is a species of snout moth in the genus Lamida. It is known from Buru, Indonesia, from which its species epithet is derived.

References

Moths described in 1931
Epipaschiinae